The 8th Beijing College Student Film Festival was held in 2001 in Beijing, China.

Awards
 Best Film Award: A Love of Blueness
 Best Director Award: Xia Gang for As Light as Glass
 Best Actor Award: Zhang Guoli for Sigh
 Best Actress Award: Yuan Quan for A Love of Blueness
 Best Visual Effects Award: Crouching Tiger, Hidden Dragon
 Best Newcomer Award: Huang Kai for As Light as Glass
 Favorite Actor Award: Chen Jianbin for Chrysanthemum Tea
 Favorite Actress Award: Wu Yue for Chrysanthemum Tea
 Favorite Film: The Gua Sha Treatment
 Artistic Exploration Award: None
 Grand Prix Award: Song of Tibet, The Gua Sha Treatment
 Committee Special Award: To be With You Forever, Fragrant Vows, Liu Tianhua
 Special Award of Merit: Xie Tieli
 Special Education Award: Silent river

References

External links

Beijing College Student Film Festival
2001 film festivals
2001 festivals in Asia
Bei